Acalyptris staticis is a moth of the family Nepticulidae. It is only known from the coast of Tenerife, but might also be present on the other Canary Islands and Morocco.

The wingspan is 4–5 mm.

The larvae feed on Limonium pectinatum. They mine the leaves of their host plant. The mine consists of a gallery, initially leaving parenchyma layers on both sides of leaves intact. The mine is filled with frass. Later, the mine consists of a full-depth mine with narrow broken
frass. Here, the mine is contorted and usually follows a curved zigzag track, with each turn touching the previous turn.

External links
Acalyptris Meyrick: revision of the platani and staticis groups in Europe and the Mediterranean (Lepidoptera: Nepticulidae)
bladmineerders.nl

Nepticulidae
Endemic fauna of the Canary Islands
Moths of Africa
Moths described in 1908